The Samsung Galaxy Note 10 (stylized as Samsung Galaxy Note10) is a line of Android-based phablets designed, developed, produced, and marketed by Samsung Electronics as part of the Samsung Galaxy Note series. They were unveiled on 7 August 2019, as the successors to the Samsung Galaxy Note 9. Details about the phablets were widely leaked in the months leading up to the phablets' announcement.

In 2020, a midrange variant, the Galaxy Note 10 Lite, was introduced with lesser specifications and features.

Specifications

Hardware

Displays 
The Galaxy Note 10 line comprises two models with various hardware specifications; Note 10 / Note 10 5G feature 6.3-inch 1080p (Note 10+ / Note 10+ 5G feature 6.8-inch 1440p) "Dynamic AMOLED" displays with HDR10+ support and "dynamic tone mapping" technology respectively. The displays have curved sides that slope over the horizontal edges of the device. The phablet also features a 19:9 aspect ratio. The front-facing cameras occupy a rounded cut-out on the top of the display, and all models utilize an ultrasonic in-screen fingerprint reader.

Storage and chipsets 
International models of the Note 10 utilize the Exynos 9825 system-on-chip, while the U.S., South American (Except Brazil) and Chinese models utilize the Qualcomm Snapdragon 855. All models are sold with 256 GB of internal Universal Flash Storage 3.0, with the Note 10+ & Note 10+ 5G also being sold in a 512 GB model and offering expandable storage via a microSD card.

Batteries 
They respectively contain non-user-replaceable 3500 and 4300 mAh Lithium-ion batteries, with both variants supporting a 25 watt Super Fast Charging, while the Note 10+ also supports 45 watt Super Fast Charging 2.0, Qi inductive charging, and the ability to charge other Qi-compatible devices from their battery power.

The device is compatible with USB PD 3.0.

Exterior 
The Note 10 and Note 10+ are the first mainstream Samsung smartphones to omit the 3.5 mm headphone jack, which earned Samsung criticism for mocking the iPhone 7's lack of the headphone jack on the Galaxy Note 7 UNPACKED keynote in August 2016 – Samsung said it used the extra space for more battery. The sleep/wake power button that used to be on the right side of the phone has been removed, consolidated with the Bixby button on the left side of the phone. New settings have been added that allow the button to be remapped as either a power button or a Bixby button. And this is the second time Samsung removed the heart rate sensor after the Galaxy S10 ( Galaxy S10e and S10 5G ) because it was rarely used by users. For the first time in Samsung's devices since the original Galaxy S (2010), the camera has been placed into the corner, similar to the iPhone X/XS/XR/11 series.

In January 2020, the Note 10 Lite was released. It is a midrange variant of the Note 10, containing the same cameras as the main variant. It features 128 GB of storage, a 6.7 inch 1080p "Super AMOLED" screen on a metallic frame, a 4,500 mAh battery and is powered by the Exynos 9810. The variant eliminates the wireless charging feature and stereo speakers, though it retains the 25 watt Super Fast Charging of the main series, and also has a headphone jack. However, the Note 10 Lite lacks a barometer sensor, which has been present on Samsung Galaxy flagships since 2012.

Cameras 
The Note 10 series features a multi-lens rear-facing camera setup with Samsung's Scene Optimizer technology. It houses a dual-aperture 12-megapixel wide-angle lens, a 12-megapixel telephoto lens and a 16-megapixel ultra-wide-angle lens with the Note 10+/ Note 10+ 5G having an additional VGA Depth Vision Camera allowing for 3D AR mapping. The front-facing camera on all models consists of a 10-megapixel punch hole lens in the top center of the display.  The camera software includes a new "Shot Suggestion" feature to assist users, "Artistic Live Filters", as well as the ability to post directly to Instagram posts and stories. It also contains the "Scene Optimizer" feature from previous Samsung phones that automatically adjusts the camera settings based on different scenes.
Both sets of cameras support 4K/60 FPS video recording and HDR10+ with more advanced video stabilization. There is also Live Focus Video enabling users to capture Bokeh backgrounds in video, much like with Portrait Mode.

S-Pen 
The S-Pen has also undergone notable changes compared to the Note 9. The pen is one piece of plastic, instead of two like Note 9, and supports more advanced Air Actions that allow users to control the phablet remotely with the pen. This includes changing the camera settings and exporting the handwritten text to Microsoft Word remotely. The S-Pen also comes with additional tips for replacement in the box.

Software 
The Note 10 range ships with Android 9 "Pie" with Samsung's One UI skin. A main design element of the One UI is intentional repositioning of key user interface elements in stock apps to improve usability on large screens. Many apps include large headers that push the beginning of content towards the center of the display, while navigation controls and other prompts are often displayed near the bottom of the display instead. In March 2020, the phones received an upgrade to Android 10, bringing with it Single Take mode from the Samsung Galaxy S20 line as well as the ability to record 4K/60fps video with the selfie camera.

Gallery

See also 
 Samsung Galaxy S10
 Samsung Galaxy Fold
 Samsung Galaxy Note series

References

External links 
 
 
 
 Official website
 Samsung Galaxy Note 10/10+ user manual (PDF)

Mobile phones introduced in 2019
Samsung Galaxy
10
Android (operating system) devices
Samsung smartphones
Mobile phones with multiple rear cameras
Mobile phones with stylus
Mobile phones with 4K video recording